Philautus kempiae (Tura bubble-nest frog, Kemp's bush frog) is a species of frog in the family Rhacophoridae (not to be confused with Philautus kempii). Being only known from its type locality near Tura in the Garo Hills in Meghalaya, northeastern India, it is an Indian endemic. The specific name kempiae honours Agnes Kemp, wife of Stanley Wells Kemp, an English zoologist and anthropologist. It is known only from the type specimen, so very little is known about biology of this species. It is presumed to be a dweller of the undergrowth of moist evergreen forests.

References

kempiae
Endemic fauna of India
Frogs of India
Amphibians described in 1919
Taxa named by George Albert Boulenger